The Rio da Várzea is a river of Rio Grande do Sul state in southern Brazil. It is a tributary of the Uruguay River.

See also
 List of rivers of Rio Grande do Sul
 Tributaries of the Río de la Plata

References

Brazilian Ministry of Transport

Rivers of Rio Grande do Sul
Tributaries of the Uruguay River